The 2015–16 AEK B.C. season was AEK's 59th season in the top-tier level Greek Basket League. AEK played in three different competitions during the season.

Transfers 2015–16

Players In

|}

Total spending:  €2,065,000+

Players Out

|}

Total income:  €80,000

Total expenditure:  €1,985,000+

Pre-season and friendlies

Competitions

Overall

Overview

Greek Basket League

League table 

Updated to match(es) played on 9 April 2016.

Regular season

Results overview

Quarterfinals

Semifinals

Third place

Greek Cup

Quarterfinals

EuroCup

Regular season - Group F

Results summary

Regular season

Results overview

References

External links
Official website
AEK B.C. at ESAKE.gr
AEK B.C. at EuroCup

2015–16
2015–16 in Greek basketball by club
2015–16 Eurocup Basketball participants